is a Japanese musician and actor. In 2001, he debuted as a member of the boy band Run&Gun. In 2012, he became the drummer of the band 4 Strike.

As an actor, Miyashita has appeared in the stage productions of Air Gear and Danganronpa. In 2008, he also provided to the voice to Yusei Fudo from Yu-Gi-Oh! 5D's.

Career
In 2001, Miyashita appeared on the audition program Study Park!!, where he was selected as one of the members for the boy band Run&Gun, later debuting on July 4, 2001 with the single "Lay-Up!" During his time with the group, in 2005, Miyashita also released a solo song titled "Yuya no Seishun Densetsu" for Run&Gun's first extended play, Hateshinai Tabi no Naka de...

In 2012, Miyashita became the drummer of the rock band 4 Strike with several actors from Musical: The Prince of Tennis.

Discography

Filmography

Movie
 Route 58 (2003)
 Yu-Gi-Oh!: Bonds Beyond Time (2010), Yusei Fudo

Television

Theater
 Musical Air Gear (Puck) (2007/01, Tokyo + Osaka)
 Musical Air Gear vs. Bacchus Super Range Remix (Puck) (2007/05, Tokyo)
 RUN&GUN stage: Blue sheets (Kenta) (2008/01, Tokyo + Osaka)
 Pippin (Louis) (2008)
 RUN&GUN stage 2: Yoosoro (2008/10)
 Boukensha-Tachi as ガクシャ
 Kuroshitsuji Musical as Kirito
 Persona 5: The Stage #2 as Junya Kaneshiro

References

External links 
 Yoshimoto Creative Agency profile
 Miyashita Yuya's blog
 

1985 births
Japanese male voice actors
Living people
Musicians from Osaka Prefecture
Male voice actors from Osaka Prefecture
21st-century Japanese singers
21st-century Japanese male singers